The  Independent Television Floodlit Trophy  or the  Independent Television Floodlit Competition was a rugby league competition initiated and sponsored by ITV.

The competition was on a knock-out basis, between eight clubs, matches being played under floodlights on various London football grounds, and the second half of each game being shown live in the London Area only on Associated-Rediffusion's "Cavalcade of Sport" programme, which was aired between 8:30 and 9:30 PM.

The idea of playing sport under floodlights was still something of a novelty for most sports, and rugby league was no exception.

The second half of the matches were shown live in the London Area only and no one in the heartlands could watch. That competition only ran for this one season.

The tournament was won by Warrington, who defeated Leigh 43–18 at Loftus Road with Harry Bath, the second row forward, being the hero scoring 22 points from 2 tries and 8 goals. Each of the participating clubs received a payment of £400.

Background 
ITV was launched on 24 September 1955 and the new channel, wanting to make their mark from the start, were quick to add sport to the programmes.

At this time there were no ITV broadcasts to the North of England; the Winter Hill transmitter (between Chorley and Bolton) did not become operational until 3 May 1956 when Granada TV started broadcasting.

The competition appeared to have been a little rushed as, although the Rugby League Council had been approached and negotiations had been proceeding, an agreement to run a competition was only finalised on 29 August.

The tournament 
The tournament officially took place in October and November 1955, (the first match actually took place Wednesday 28 September) and the literature stated that the contestants comprised "the  top four sides from each county", based on the previous seasons league positions. However, these rankings do not conform to the finishing positions in either the Championship or the county leagues from the 1954–55 season.

The first match to be played in Round 1 was between Wigan and Huddersfield, with Wigan suffering a defeat by 33–11.

Competition and results

Round 1 – first round 
The first round involved four matches and eight clubs, with all games being played in London. The two teams who won by the largest points margin progressed to the final.

Table

Pos = Finishing position   P = Games played   W = Wins   D = Draw   L = Lose
PF = Points scored   PA = Points against   Pts = League points   PD = Points scored difference

Final

See also 
1955–56 Northern Rugby Football League season
1955 Lancashire Cup
1955 Yorkshire Cup
BBC2 Floodlit Trophy
Rugby league county cups

References

External links
1896–97 Northern Rugby Football Union season at wigan.rlfans.com
The Northern Union at warringtonwolves.org
Huddersfield R L Heritage
Trandiffusion
Warrington Wolves 1940's and 1950's
Wigan archives
Huddersfield Yearbook 1956
I'm Wakefield until I die
Old London Sports Venues

1955 in rugby league
1955 in English sport
BBC2 Floodlit Trophy
September 1955 sports events in the United Kingdom
October 1955 sports events in the United Kingdom
November 1955 sports events in the United Kingdom